STZ TV is a noncommercial television station broadcasting from Sertãozinho, state of São Paulo, Brazil. It is owned by a local cultural foundation and rebroadcasts programs from TV Brasil.

History
The station was founded in 2007.

References

Television channels and stations established in 2007
Television stations in Brazil
2007 establishments in Brazil